Takashi Nakakura (Japanese: 中蔵隆志, Nakakura Takashi, born March 23, 1977) is a Japanese mixed martial artist, and the former Shooto welterweight champion. Nakakura is also a seido kaikan karate and Judo black belt. He took up Judo for three years in high school and soon after started training in seido kaikan karate where he took 2nd in the West Japan B-league competition losing only to Tsuyoshi Nakasako, a current K-1 fighter.

MMA career 
Nakakura made his Shooto debut in 2002, in GIG: East 11. He won by submission (rear naked choke) over Heima Hashimoto in a fight that lasted a bit over three minutes. He remained undefeated for two years, until losing by decision to Takumi Nakayama in 2004. On May 3, 2008, he fought Ganjo Tetsuku at Shooto's Tradition 01 event for Shooto's Vacant welterweight championship, which he won by Unanimous Decision.

May 10, 2009 Shooto Tradition Final, Nakakura fought a non title bout against former Pride Fighting Championships lightweight title holder Takanori Gomi. Although Nakakura  was willing stand and strike with Gomi, he was dominated from the opening bell. Takanori Gomi had dropped and stopped the Shooto champion with strikes at 4:42 into the second round. A few months later he vacates his Shooto belt due to eye injury.

Championships and accomplishments
Shooto
Shooto Lightweight Championship (1 Time)
Shooto Pacific Rim Welterweight Championship (1 Time)

Mixed martial arts record 

|-
|  Loss
| align=center| 11–4–1
| Kuniyoshi Hironaka
| Decision (unanimous)
| Shooto: Shooto Tradition 2011
| 
| align=center| 3
| align=center| 5:00
| Tokyo, Japan
| 
|-
|  Loss
| align=center| 11–3–1
| Takanori Gomi
| KO (punches)
| Shooto: Shooto Tradition Final
| 
| align=center| 2
| align=center| 4:42
| Tokyo, Japan
| 
|-
|  Win
| align=center| 11–2–1
| Bendy Casimir
| Submission (rear-naked choke)
| Shooto: Shooto Tradition 4
| 
| align=center| 1
| align=center| 4:58
| Tokyo, Japan
| 
|-
|  Win
| align=center| 10–2–1
| Ganjo Tentsuku
| Decision (unanimous)
| Shooto: Shooto Tradition 1
| 
| align=center| 3
| align=center| 5:00
| Tokyo, Japan
| Won vacant Shooto Lightweight Championship. Later vacated after losing non title fight to Takanori Gomi
|-
|  Win
| align=center| 9–2–1
| Yusuke Endo
| Decision (unanimous)
| Shooto: Back To Our Roots 6
| 
| align=center| 3
| align=center| 5:00
| Tokyo, Japan
| 
|-
|  Win
| align=center| 8–2–1
| Jani Lax
| Submission (achilles lock)
| Shooto: Back To Our Roots 4
| 
| align=center| 1
| align=center| 2:54
| Tokyo, Japan
| 
|-
|  Win
| align=center| 7–2–1
| Mizuto Hirota
| Decision (unanimous)
| Shooto: Back To Our Roots 1
| 
| align=center| 3
| align=center| 5:00
| Yokohama Kanagawa, Japan
| Won vacant Shooto Pacific Rim Welterweight Championship. Later vacated after winning Shooto Lightweight Championship.
|-
|  Draw
| align=center| 6–2–1
| Ganjo Tentsuku
| Draw
| Shooto: Champion Carnival
| 
| align=center| 3
| align=center| 5:00
| Yokohama Kanagawa, Japan
| 
|-
|  Loss
| align=center| 6–2
| Mitsuhiro Ishida
| TKO (cut)
| Shooto: Alive Road
| 
| align=center| 3
| align=center| 1:31
| Yokohama Kanagawa, Japan
| 
|-
|  Win
| align=center| 6–1
| Ray Cooper
| TKO (cut)
| Shooto: 5/4 in Korakuen Hall
| 
| align=center| 2
| align=center| 1:14
| Tokyo, Japan
| 
|-
|  Win
| align=center| 5–1
| Kenichiro Togashi
| Decision (unanimous)
| Shooto 2004: 10/17 in Osaka Prefectural Gymnasium
| 
| align=center| 3
| align=center| 5:00
| Osaka, Japan
| 
|-
|  Loss
| align=center| 4–1
| Takumi Nakayama
| Decision (unanimous)
| Shooto 2004: 4/11 in Osaka Prefectural Gymnasium
| 
| align=center| 3
| align=center| 5:00
| Osaka, Japan
| 
|-
|  Win
| align=center| 4–0
| Saburo Kawakatsu
| Decision (unanimous)
| Shooto: Gig West 4
| 
| align=center| 2
| align=center| 5:00
| Osaka, Japan
| 
|-
|  Win
| align=center| 3–0
| Masato Fujiwara
| Submission (triangle choke)
| Shooto 2003: 6/27 in Hiroshima Sun Plaza
| 
| align=center| 1
| align=center| 3:48
| Hiroshima, Japan
| 
|-
|  Win
| align=center| 2–0
| Masaya Takita
| Decision (unanimous)
| Shooto: Gig West 3
| 
| align=center| 2
| align=center| 5:00
| Osaka, Japan
| 
|-
|  Win
| align=center| 1–0
| Heima Hashimoto
| Submission (rear-naked choke)
| Shooto: Gig East 11
| 
| align=center| 2
| align=center| 3:17
| Tokyo, Japan
|

Footnotes

1977 births
Living people
Japanese male mixed martial artists
Lightweight mixed martial artists
Welterweight mixed martial artists
Mixed martial artists utilizing Seidokaikan
Mixed martial artists utilizing judo
Japanese male judoka
Japanese male karateka
Sportspeople from Osaka
Place of birth missing (living people)
21st-century Japanese people